

Career
Robert Brian Havelock (born 9 May 1942 in Yarm, Yorkshire) is a former motorcycle speedway rider and is the former promoter of the Redcar Bears, who compete in the Premier League. A long career with consistent scoring for his clubs, a favourite among fans. 
His son Gary Havelock was the 1992 World Champion.

After Speedway
Since retiring, worked as a Heating Engineer.
Married to Marjorie, they have two children, Lisa and Gary. Enjoys competition fishing.
Was a promoter at Redcar.

References

External links
https://wwosbackup.proboards.com/thread/1163 

1942 births
Living people
British speedway riders
English motorcycle racers
People from Yarm
Sportspeople from County Durham
Workington Comets riders
Berwick Bandits riders
Newcastle Diamonds riders
Stoke Potters riders
Sunderland Stars riders
Halifax Dukes riders
Hull Vikings riders
Exeter Falcons riders
Middlesbrough Bears riders
Coventry Bees riders
Sportspeople from Yorkshire